The 2016–17 A-1 League was the 26th season of the A-1 League, the highest professional basketball league in Croatia. The season started on 5 October 2016 and finished on 1 June 2017. Cedevita won its fourth national championship after defeating Cibona in the playoffs final.

Format
All participants in A-1 League including teams that played in the ABA League joined the regular season. It was played in a double round-robin format where the eight first qualified teams joined the playoffs while the last qualified one was directly relegated and the 13th qualified played a relegation playoff.

Teams

Regular season

League table

Results

Playoffs

References

External links
Official Site 
Scoresway Page
Eurobasket.com League Page

A-1 Liga seasons
Croatian
A1